Ruadhan Jones (born 9 February 1996) is an Irish cricketer. He made his Twenty20 debut for Munster Reds in the 2018 Inter-Provincial Trophy on 6 July 2018. In 2015 Ruadhán joined YMCA CC from Terenure CC.

Jones completed a degree in media at University College Cork and is studying for a masters in journalism at Technological University of Dublin. He has contributed articles to a number of publications such as The Irish Catholic. Jones from Grenagh, Co. Cork, attended Scoil Mhuire, Gan Smál, Blarney.

References

External links
 

1996 births
Living people
Irish cricketers
Place of birth missing (living people)
Munster Reds cricketers